Geir Televik (born 23 July 1971) is a retired Norwegian football striker.

He started his career in Tornado FK. For IL Hødd he participated in their promotion to the highest level after the 1994 season. He scored 13 goals in the 1995 Norwegian Premier League; only five players had more goals.

He spent some time in the early summer of 1998 on loan to Hødd. After the 1998 season Reading F.C. had him on trial, but neither Televik nor Trond Strande was offered a contract. Televik was released from Molde in December. He rejoined Hødd. In late 1999 he was loaned by Aalesunds FK for the playoffs to the First Division. He retired after the 2005 season.

References

1971 births
Living people
Norwegian footballers
IL Hødd players
Molde FK players
Aalesunds FK players
Eliteserien players
People from Sogn og Fjordane
Association football forwards
Sportspeople from Vestland